Alfred Edward Green (July 11, 1889 – September 4, 1960) was an American film director. Green entered film in 1912 as an actor for the Selig Polyscope Company. He became an assistant to director Colin Campbell. He then started to direct two-reelers until he started features in 1917.

Biography

Green was born on July 11, 1889, in Perris, California.

In a durable career lasting until the 1950s, Green directed major stars such as Mary Pickford, Wallace Reid, Barbara Stanwyck, William Powell, and Colleen Moore. In 1926's Ella Cinders, he also played a director. In 1935, Green directed Dangerous, starring Bette Davis, who won Best Actress for her performance. Much later came Green's hit success The Jolson Story (1946) and the affectionate western Four Faces West (1948), known outside the US by the more expressive title They Passed This Way. Then followed another string of B movies as well as two more biographical films, The Jackie Robinson Story (1950) and The Eddie Cantor Story (1953). After retiring from motion pictures, he directed several TV episodes.

Green was married to silent film actress Vivian Reed. They had three children, Douglas Green, Hilton A. Green, and Marshall Green, all of whom worked as assistant directors.

Green died on September 4, 1960, in Hollywood, California.

Legacy
Green has a star on the Hollywood Walk of Fame.

Filmography

References

External links

1889 births
1960 deaths
People from Perris, California
Film directors from California
Burials at Forest Lawn Memorial Park (Glendale)